arpwatch is a computer software tool for monitoring Address Resolution Protocol traffic on a computer network. It generates a log of observed pairing of IP addresses with MAC addresses along with a timestamp when the pairing appeared on the network.  It also has the option of sending an email to an administrator when a pairing changes or is added.

Network administrators monitor ARP activity to detect ARP spoofing, network flip-flops, changed and new stations and address reuse.

arpwatch was developed by Lawrence Berkeley National Laboratory, Network Research Group, as open-source software and is released under the BSD license.

See also
ArpON
arping
Ettercap

References

External links
 Source files

Free network management software
Linux security software
Unix security software
Software using the BSD license